Continental is a manufacturer of side dishes and recipe bases (including packs of dried pasta and sauces). The company is based in Australia, and is a subsidiary of Unilever.

Information
The Continental manufacturer has been in business for over 50 years now. The Continental website includes recipes and cooking ideas for people to try at home while using their products. The head chef at Continental is Julianne Lever. The other chefs include Julie Baylis, Kelly Cruickshanks, John Doyle, and Luigi Carola.

Products
Continental produces the following products:
soups
side dishes
Meal Kits
Meal Bases
Stocks
Gravies & Sauces
Spices
Deb Mashed Potato
Surprise Peas

References

See also 
 List of brand name food products
 List of food companies

Food and drink companies of Australia
Unilever brands
Food product brands